The Cumberland County Blues are a Canadian Junior ice hockey club from Springhill, Nova Scotia.  They are members of the Nova Scotia Junior Hockey League and are 2010 Don Johnson Cup Maritime Junior B champions.

History
In 2007, the Blues hosted the Don Johnson Cup, the Maritime Junior B Championship.  They would go on to lose in the final to the East Hants Penguins 2–0.  They finished the tournament with a 4–2–0 record.

In 2010, the Cumberland County Blues won their second consecutive NSJHL championship.  They won the right to attend their second straight Don Johnson Cup Maritime Junior B Championship.  In 2009, after an impressive 3–1–0 record in the round robin, they were dropped 6–5 in the semi-final by the St. John's Junior Hockey League's St. John's Jr. Caps in Bay Roberts, Newfoundland and Labrador.  In 2010, in St. Margaret's Bay, Nova Scotia, the Blues had a chance for redemption.  In the first game of the round robin, the Blues clipped the host Bay Ducks 6–4.  In their second game, they defeated the defending Jr. Caps 3–2 in an overtime shootout.  The Blues third game was lost to the New Brunswick Junior B Hockey League's Charlotte County Jr. Silverkings 4–3, but they closed out the round robin strong the next day by beating the Island Junior Hockey League's Kensington Vipers 7–2 to clinch first in the tournament.  On April 24, the Blues again played the Jr. Caps in the semi-final.  The Blues again defeated them 3–2 to enter the finals.  On April 25, in the final, the Blues beat the Bay Ducks 4–1 to clinch their first ever Don Johnson Cup as Maritime Champions.

Season-by-season record

Don Johnson Cup
Eastern Canada Jr B Championships

External links

Ice hockey teams in Nova Scotia
2002 establishments in Nova Scotia
Ice hockey clubs established in 2002
Cumberland County, Nova Scotia